Herbert Howells completed his sonata for oboe and piano in 1942. Rejected by its planned dedicatee Léon Goossens, the composition was suppressed and not performed in public until after the composers death in 1983.

History

The precise circumstances under which Howells began and composed the sonata are unknown. The surviving copy of the manuscript indicates that the sonata was completed on the 27th of August, 1942 and that it was intended for Léon Goossens. Goosens, when interviewed about the sonata in 1986 could only recall that he had expressed reservations about the work's structure. Howells had then responded to the effect that he would 'have another go at it' and took the manuscript with him.

It is not clear what happened next, but it is widely believed that the composers later clarinet sonata resulted from attempts at revising the oboe sonata.

The work was rediscovered in 1978 by author Christopher Palmer, at that time working on a biography of Howells. Palmer obtained permission to photocopy the manuscript score, and while not discussing the work in the resulting biography, did list the sonata as one of the composer's principal works.

Following the composers death an attempt was made to locate the original manuscript, but it had apparently become lost some time after Palmer made his photocopy. A performing score was prepared and the work premiered to the public by oboist Sarah Francis and pianist Peter Dickinson on the 9th of July, 1984 at the Chetenham Festival, with the London premier taking place on the 4th of October of the same year. A recording was made by Hyperion in 1985 and publication by Novello followed in 1986.

Structure

The sonata, while it is nominally structured in four movements, is effectively a two-movement work with the first movement directly linked to the second and the third movement directly linked to the fourth:

Placido, teneramente, ma con moto - Lento, assai espressivo e tranquillo
Allegro mosso, scherzando - Epliogue: Tranquillo, mesto, ma con moto

Since the work was rediscovered, there has been speculation about just what it was that caused Goosens to reject the sonata. In looking at the later clarinet sonata, both Huss and the anonymous author of the liner notes to the Hyperion recording comment that while both compositions share structural and rhythmic similarities, the clarinet sonata represents a simplification and clarification over the earlier work. Huss further speculates that as he started the process of revision Howells may have decided that in attempting to write a composition that would challenge Goosens skills as an oboist, he had in fact written beyond the capabilities of the oboe as he perceived them. The author of the Hyperion liner notes comments that in their opinion that the ending of the composition, which recapitulates material from the first two movements may have been a miscalculation on the composers part.

Huss further notes that while the first movement of the sonata is entirely original material, the second through fourth movements quote from the composers then unpublished setting of "Oh Garlands, Hanging By The Door", composed in 1921. Huss speculates that this was done because the music quoted created a specific atmosphere the composer wanted the piece to express. Sorrels in their thesis comments that this relationship was apparently not known when the work was published. He also notes that while Huss's speculation is attractive, it does require that certain assumptions to be made about how the work was composed and that the composer himself left no clue.

References
Notes

Sources

External links

Howells oboe sonata
Compositions by Herbert Howells
1942 compositions
Howells